KIDH-LP (97.5 FM, "Higher Rock Radio") is a radio station licensed to serve the community of Meridian, Idaho. The station is owned by Calvary Chapel Meridian, Inc., and airs a mix of Christian religious teaching and contemporary Christian music.

The station was assigned the KIDH-LP call letters by the Federal Communications Commission on May 19, 2015.

References

External links
 Official Website
 FCC Public Inspection File for KIDH-LP
 

IDH-LP
Radio stations established in 2015
2015 establishments in Idaho
IDH-LP
Contemporary Christian radio stations in the United States
Ada County, Idaho